Kurt Falls (born 13 August 1996) is an Australian professional rugby league footballer who last played as a  or  for the Penrith Panthers in the NRL.

Background
Falls graduated from St Dominic's College, Penrith in 2014 and played alongside Nathan Cleary in the Schoolboy Trophy winning team of 2014. He scored the match-winning try in the Grand Final. He played his junior rugby league with Brothers Penrith.

Playing career
Falls joined the Penrith Panthers in 2021. In round 13 of the 2022 NRL season, at almost 26 years of age, Falls made his first grade debut for the Penrith Panthers in his side's 30−18 victory over the Canterbury-Bankstown Bulldogs at Penrith Stadium. Falls kicked five conversions in the match.
Falls spent the majority of 2022 playing for Penrith's NSW Cup team. Falls scored a try and kicked four goals in Penrith's 29-22 victory over Canterbury in the 2022 NSW Cup Grand Final.
On 2 October 2022, Falls played in Penrith's 44-10 victory over Norths Devils in the NRL State Championship final. Falls was released from the Panthers at the end of the 2022 NRL season.

References

External links
Penrith Panthers profile

1996 births
Living people
Australian rugby league players
Penrith Panthers players
Rugby league halfbacks
Rugby league players from Penrith, New South Wales